Quartell is a small town and municipality in the fertile comarca of Camp de Morvedre in the Province of Valencia in eastern Spain. It is close to the sea, thirty five kilometers north of the provincial capital city Valencia, and ten kilometers north of Sagunto.

References

External links
 

Municipalities in the Province of Valencia
Camp de Morvedre